Stochastic computing is a collection of techniques that represent continuous values by streams of random bits. Complex computations can then be computed by simple bit-wise operations on the streams. Stochastic computing is distinct from the study of randomized algorithms.

Motivation and a simple example 

Suppose that  is given, and we wish to compute . Stochastic computing performs this operation using probability instead of arithmetic.

Specifically, suppose that there are two random, independent bit streams called stochastic numbers (i.e. We can take the logical AND of the two streams.

By observing enough output bits and measuring the frequency of ones, it is possible to estimate  to arbitrary accuracy.

More generally speaking, stochastic computing represents numbers as streams of random bits and reconstructs numbers by calculating frequencies. (Because of the method of reconstruction, devices that perform these operations are sometimes called stochastic averaging processors.) In modern terms, stochastic computing can be viewed as an interpretation of calculations in probabilistic terms, which are then evaluated with a Gibbs sampler. It can also be interpreted as a hybrid analog/digital computer.

History 

Stochastic computing was first introduced in a pioneering paper by John von Neumann in 1953. However, the
theory could not be fully developed until advances in computing of the 1960s,

mostly through a series of simultaneous and parallel efforts in the US
and the UK.
By the late 1960s, attention turned to the design of
special-purpose hardware to perform stochastic computation.  A host
of these machines were constructed between 1969 and 1974; RASCEL
is pictured in this article.

Despite the intense interest in the 1960s and 1970s, stochastic
computing ultimately failed to compete with more traditional digital
logic, for reasons outlined below.  The first (and last)
International Symposium on Stochastic Computing
took place in 1978; active research in the area dwindled over the next
few years.

Although stochastic computing declined as a general method of
computing, it has shown promise in several applications.  Research has
traditionally focused on certain tasks in machine learning and
control.

Somewhat recently, interest has turned towards stochastic
decoding, which applies stochastic computing to the decoding of error
correcting codes. More recently, stochastic circuits have been successfully used in image processing tasks such as edge detection
 and image thresholding.

Strengths and weaknesses 

Although stochastic computing was a historical failure, it may still remain relevant for
solving certain problems.  To understand when it remains relevant, it is useful to
compare stochastic computing with more traditional methods of digital computing.

Strengths 
Suppose we wish to multiply
two numbers each with  bits of precision.
Using the typical long
multiplication method, we need to perform
 operations.  With stochastic computing, we can
AND together any number of bits and the expected value will always
be correct.  (However, with a small number of samples the variance will
render the actual result highly inaccurate).

Moreover, the underlying operations in a digital multiplier are
full adders, whereas a stochastic
computer only requires an AND gate.  Additionally,
a digital multiplier would naively require  input wires,
whereas a stochastic multiplier would only require 2 input wires.
(If the digital multiplier serialized its output, however, it would also
require only 2 input wires.)

Additionally, stochastic computing is robust against noise; if a few
bits in a stream are flipped, those errors will have no significant impact
on the solution.

Furthermore, stochastic computing elements can tolerate skew in the arrival time of the inputs.
Circuits work properly even when the inputs are misaligned temporally. As a result, stochastic
systems can be designed to work with inexpensive locally generated clocks instead of using a global clock and 
an expensive clock distribution network.

Finally, stochastic computing provides an estimate of the solution
that grows more accurate as we extend the bit stream.  In particular,
it provides a rough estimate very rapidly.  This property is usually 
referred to as progressive precision, which suggests that the precision
of stochastic numbers (bit streams) increases as computation proceeds.

It is as if the most significant bits of the number
arrive before its least significant bits; unlike the
conventional arithmetic circuits where the most
significant bits usually arrive last. In some
iterative systems the partial solutions obtained through progressive precision can provide faster feedback
than through traditional computing methods, leading to faster
convergence.

Weaknesses 

Stochastic computing is, by its very nature, random.  When we examine
a random bit stream and try to reconstruct the underlying value, the effective precision
can be measured by the variance of our sample.  In the example above, the digital multiplier
computes a number to  bits of accuracy, so the
If we are using a random bit
stream to estimate a number and want the standard deviation of our
estimate of the solution to be at least , we
would need  samples.  This represents an
exponential increase in work. In certain applications, however, the
progressive precision property of stochastic computing can be exploited
to compensate this exponential loss.

Second, stochastic computing requires a method of generating random
biased bit streams.  In practice, these streams are generated with
pseudo-random number generators.  Unfortunately, generating
(pseudo-)random bits is fairly costly (compared to the expense of,
e.g., a full adder).  Therefore, the gate-level advantage of
stochastic computing is typically lost.

Third, the analysis of stochastic computing assumes that the bit
streams are independent (uncorrelated).  If this assumption does not
hold, stochastic computing can fail dramatically.  For instance, if we
try to compute  by multiplying a bit stream for
 by itself, the process fails: since , the stochastic computation would yield , which is not generally true (unless 0 or 1).
In systems with feedback, the problem of decorrelation can manifest in
more complicated ways.  Systems of stochastic processors are prone to
latching, where feedback between different components can achieve
a deadlocked state.
A great deal of effort must be spent decorrelating the system to
attempt to remediate latching.

Fourth, although some digital functions have very simple stochastic
counterparts (such as the translation between multiplication and the
AND gate), many do not.  Trying to express these functions stochastically
may cause various pathologies.  For instance, stochastic decoding requires
the computation of the function .
There is no single bit operation that can compute this function; the usual solution
involves producing correlated output bits, which, as we have seen above, can cause
a host of problems.

Other functions (such as the averaging operator  require 
either stream decimation or inflation.  Tradeoffs between precision and memory
can be challenging.

Stochastic decoding 

Although stochastic computing has a number of defects when considered
as a method of general computation, there are certain applications
that highlight its strengths.  One notable case occurs in the
decoding of certain error correcting codes.

In developments unrelated to stochastic computing, highly effective
methods of decoding LDPC codes using
the belief propagation algorithm were
developed.  Belief propagation in this context involves iteratively
reestimating certain parameters using two basic operations
(essentially, a probabilistic XOR operation and an averaging
operation).

In 2003, researchers realized that these two operations could be
modeled very simply with stochastic computing.
Moreover, since the
belief propagation algorithm is iterative, stochastic computing provides partial
solutions that may lead to faster convergence.
Hardware implementations of stochastic decoders have been built on FPGAs.

The proponents of these methods argue that the performance of stochastic decoding is
competitive with digital alternatives.

Deterministic Methods to Stochastic Computing 

Deterministic methods of SC has been developed to perform completely accurate computation with SC circuits. The essential principle of these methods is that every bit of one bit-streams interacts with every bit of the other bit-streams exactly once. To produce completely accurate result with these methods, the operation must run for the product of the length of input bit-streams. Deterministic methods are developed based on unary bit-streams, pseudo-random bit-streams, and low-discrepancy bit-streams.

Variants of stochastic computing 

There are a number of variants of the basic stochastic computing
paradigm.  Further information can be found in the referenced book by
Mars and Poppelbaum.

Bundle Processing involves sending a fixed number of
bits instead of a stream.  One of the advantages of this approach is
that the precision is improved.  To see why, suppose we transmit
 bits.  In regular stochastic computing, we can
represent a precision of roughly  different
values, because of the variance of the estimate.  In bundle
However, bundle processing retains the same robustness to error of
regular stochastic processing.

Ergodic Processing involves sending a stream of bundles, which
captures the benefits of regular stochastic and bundle processing.

Burst Processing encodes a number by a higher base increasing
stream.  For instance, we would encode 4.3 with ten decimal digits as
 4444444555
since the average value of the preceding stream is 4.3.  This
representation offers various advantages: there is no randomization
since the numbers appear in increasing order,
so the PRNG issues are avoided, but many of the advantages of
stochastic computing are retained (such as partial estimates of the
solution).  Additionally, it retains the linear precision of bundle
and ergodic processing.

See also
 Unconventional computing

References

Further reading
 
 

History of computing hardware
Models of computation
Statistical randomness